Joseph Frederick Davis (23 May 1929 – 10 September 1996) was an English professional footballer who played as a wing-half. He made appearances in the English Football League during the 1950s and 60s with Reading and Wrexham.

References

1929 births
1996 deaths
English footballers
Association football forwards
Bloxwich Strollers F.C. players
Reading F.C. players
Wrexham A.F.C. players
Rhyl F.C. players
English Football League players